Angulyagra polyzonata is a species of a freshwater snail with a gill and an operculum, an aquatic gastropod mollusk in the family Viviparidae.

Distribution 
This species is found in southern and southeastern China and in northern Vietnam. It is non-indigenous in Taiwan.

Description
The width of the shell is 11.2–21.4 mm. The height of the shell is 13.8–32.5 mm.

Similar species is Bellamya heudei.

Ecology

Habitat 
Angulyagra polyzonata lakes, rivers, creeks and drains. It is a common species in aquaculture ponds.

Parasites and predators
Angulyagra polyzonata is a host of a trematode Multicotyle purvisi.

Predators of Angulyagra polyzonata include the black carp Mylopharyngodon piceus.

Human use 
This species is eaten by people and it is used as fish, poultry and livestock raising. It is usually collected from the aquaculture pond when the pond is empty.

References

External links

Viviparidae